See:

 Harald Høffding, Danish philosopher, great-uncle of Wassily Hoeffding
 Wassily Hoeffding, Finnish statistician, great-nephew of Harald Høffding